The Canal Streetcar Line is a historic streetcar line in New Orleans, Louisiana. It is operated by the New Orleans Regional Transit Authority (RTA). It originally operated from 1861 to 1964. It was redesigned and rebuilt between 2000 and 2004, and operation was reinstated in 2004 after a 40-year hiatus. Each branch is denoted with the red and light green colors respectively on most RTA publications.

Before the return of the line, the Canal Street corridor was served from 1964 to 2004 by several RTA bus lines utilizing the neutral ground in the Central Business District where the tracks now run.

Route description 
The trunk of the Canal Streetcar line travels a direct route along Canal Street from where it begins at Convention Center Boulevard (in front of Harrah's Casino) to Carrollton Avenue where the two branches split. Tracks continue toward the River to the tracks utilized by the Riverfront line. Leaving the downtown area, the line mostly traverses several neighborhoods in the Mid-City portion of the city and consists of 3 miles (4.8 km) inland.

Branches 
The "Cemeteries" branch continues on Canal Street past Carrollton Avenue to its terminus at Metairie Road (which continues as City Park Avenue), surrounded by several cemeteries. For much of its history, this area constituted the northern (lakeside) boundary of the city, which explains the density of cemeteries, Catholic, Protestant, and Jewish, in this area. Beginning July 31, 2017, and completed on December 4, a new loop terminal was built north of City Park Avenue on Canal Boulevard, providing passengers with better access to transfer between the streetcars and connecting bus lines. Following a month of testing and training, the new loop went into service January 7, 2017.

The "City Park/Museum" branch (or sometimes just "City Park") turns northward from Canal onto North Carrollton Avenue, where it runs in the inside lanes of the street rather than in the neutral ground. It is reduced to a single track at the intersection of City Park/Moss Avenues and returns to the neutral ground before it ends at Beauregard Circle, at Esplanade Avenue and Bayou St. John, near the entrance of the New Orleans Museum of Art in City Park. It is within easy walking distance of the New Orleans Fairgrounds, site of the yearly Jazz and Heritage Festival.

On October 12, 2019, a building under construction at the corner of Canal Street and N. Rampart Street collapsed (see Hard Rock Hotel Collapse). Currently, in order to provide service along Loyola Avenue, Canal-Cemeteries streetcars operate along that avenue instead of going down Canal Street from Loyola Avenue (Elk Place) to the river. Also, Canal-City Park/Museum cars turn back at LaSalle Street, because they cannot proceed past the blockage at Rampart Street. Service between Elk Place and the river is being provided by diesel buses.

The Canal Cemeteries and City Park branches were originally designated as Routes 42 and 45, respectively, until January 2009, when the route numbers were changed to 47 and 48.

History 

The Canal Street Line traces its origins to the old New Orleans City RR Co., founded to provide horse-drawn streetcar service throughout the city. This system's first lines opened in June 1861, running on Esplanade, Magazine, Prytania, and Canal Streets. The original car barn for the Canal Line, which served it until the end in 1964, was established at White Street. The line ran on its namesake street from St. Charles Street to the car barn; it was extended in August all the way to the end of the street at the Cemeteries.

The City RR came under the control of the New Orleans Traction Co. in 1892 as the system was prepared for electrification. A large order for new electric streetcars was placed with the Brill Co. of Philadelphia. The Canal Line was the first New Orleans Traction line to be electrified, beginning electric service on July 28, 1894. It was followed very quickly by Esplanade and the rest of the company's horsecar lines. The line was extended slightly in the central business district to terminate at the foot of Canal Street, not far from the Mississippi River.

In 1901, the streetcar company slightly extended the Canal and Esplanade Lines so that their outer ends met at City Park Ave., and connected them together in a Belt Line. Canal cars left the central business district on Canal Street, operated to City Park Ave., turned down that street to Esplanade Ave., and returned on Esplanade to Rampart and thus back to Canal Street. Cars marked Esplanade left the central business district via Rampart Street down to Esplanade, then operated out Esplanade to City Park Ave. to Canal, and returned on Canal Street. This Belt Line arrangement lasted until December 27, 1934, when Esplanade Ave. was converted to buses, and Canal resumed running only on Canal Street, end-to-end.

From 1934 to 1950, there were two lines running on Canal Street. Cars marked West End operated from the foot of Canal to the outer end of the street at the cemeteries, then turned left onto City Park Avenue (Metairie Road) to the New Basin Canal, and then out the east bank of that canal to the West End amusement area at Lake Pontchartrain. Cars marked Cemeteries followed the same route, but turned back at the cemeteries immediately after turning off of Metairie Road. West End made only limited stops along Canal Street from Claiborne Ave. to City Park Ave. The West End line was converted to buses in 1950, after which the surviving Cemeteries cars were once again signed Canal. In 1951, the outer terminus of the Canal Line was moved to the end of Canal Street, and tracks on City Park Ave. (Metairie Road) were removed.

In 1964, the streetcar company (known since 1922 as New Orleans Public Service Incorporated, or NOPSI) proposed to convert the Canal line to buses. The line was to be combined with the West End and Canal Boulevard bus lines, so that patrons could have a one-seat ride all the way from the central business district to Lake Pontchartrain. There was tremendous controversy over the proposal from the protests of preservationists. While the St. Charles Streetcar line was spared, the Canal line was not. The last day was May 30, 1964, with the final run (NOPSI car 972, carrying banners which read "See Me On St. Charles") leaving Canal Line tracks at about 5:00 a.m. on May 31. All the streetcars, except for 35 reserved for the St. Charles Line, were scrapped or donated to museums across the country, and all track and overhead wire were removed.

By the 1990s, interest in streetcars was rekindled, not only in New Orleans, but in many cities around the country. Plans for the restoration of the Canal Line were announced in 2000, and tracks were rebuilt from the foot of Canal Street out to the cemeteries. A branch line was created on North Carrollton Avenue, which had never before had streetcar service. Finally, the Canal streetcar line reopened April 18, 2004, almost 40 years after its close. It replaced multiple stop service on Canal in the Mid-City mostly except for a limited stop express line which ran all the way to the lake, which was eliminated suddenly due to Hurricane Katrina.

In 2005, Hurricane Katrina damaged the red streetcars of the Canal and Riverfront lines which were stored at the car barn behind the RTA headquarters. As streetcar service was restored, it was forced to utilize the green cars borrowed from the St. Charles line while the red cars were rebuilt.

Operation 
The Canal Streetcar trunk operates frequent service 24 hours a day, 7 days a week, from about every eight minutes during the day to about every sixteen minutes late at night. Each branch, Canal-Cemeteries and Canal-City Park/Museum, operates every sixteen minutes during the day to past midnight, then every 32 minutes until about 5 a.m.

List of streetcar stops 
From Harrah's Casino to Mid-City

Footnotes

References

External links 

 Canal-Cemeteries line schedule
 Canal-City Park/Museum line schedule

Passenger rail transportation in Louisiana
Transportation in New Orleans
Light rail in Louisiana
Heritage streetcar systems
New Orleans